Birchbark biting (Ojibwe: Mazinibaganjigan, plural: mazinibaganjiganan) is an Indigenous artform made by Anishinaabeg, including Ojibwe people, Potawatomi, and Odawa, as well as Cree and other Algonquian peoples of the Subarctic and Great Lakes regions of Canada and the United States. Artists bite on small pieces of folded birch bark to form intricate designs.

Indigenous artists used birchbark biting for entertaining in storytelling and to create patterns for quillwork and other art forms.

In the 17th century, Jesuits sent samples of this artform to Europe, where it had been previously unknown. The practice remained common in Saskatchewan into the 1950s.

Name
Birchbark biting is also known as mazinashkwemaganjigan(-an) (by Northwestern Ontario Ojibwe) and njigan(-an) (by Wisconsin Ojibwe). In English, this has been described either as "birch bark bitings" or "birch bark transparencies."

Process
Artists chose thin and flexible pieces of birch bark. This kind of bark is easiest to find in the early spring. Using the eyeteeth to bite, the bite pressures can either pierce the bark pieces into a lace or just make certain areas thinner to allow for light to pass through.  If the bark piece is carefully folded, symmetrical designs can also be made onto it.

Uses
Many of the designs that are used contain symbolic and religious significance to the Ojibwe and other tribes. Though the practice almost died out, an estimated dozen practitioners are active in Canada and the United States, some of whom display the craft in contexts outside of their original intentions to show evidence of this ancient practice. Birchbark bitings can be used in storytelling, as patterns for quillwork and beadwork, as well as finished pieces of art.  The holes created by biting are sometimes filled with coloured threads to create woven designs.

See also
Wanesia Spry Misquadace, contemporary, traditional Annishinabae/Minnesota Lake Superior Chippewa Tribe/Fond Du Lac Minnesota/Ojibwe people birchbark biter, Indigenous jeweler, native woman metalsmith, award-winning birchbark bitings, innovations, evolution of biting techniques in new materials, concepts, reawakening the art form in 2005 SWAIA Indian Arts, lectures and indigenous scholar
 Kelly Church, contemporary Potawatomi/Odawa/Ojibwe birchbark biter and black ash basket maker
 Angelique Merasty (Woodland Cree, 1924–1996), birchbark biting artist
Wiigwaasabak: birch bark scrolls
jiimaan: Canoe typically made using birch bark
maniwiigwaasekomaan: Knife for harvesting birch bark
wiigiwaam: Wigwam, typically made using birch bark
wiigwaasi-makak: boxes and other containers made of birch bark
wiigwaas-onaagan: dishes and trays made of birch bark

References

External links
 National Anthropological Archives: Birch bark transparency
 Birch Bark Biting
 The First Nations art of birch bark biting
 Many uses of birch bark

Native American art
Betula
Ojibwe culture
Anishinaabe culture
Native American history of Michigan
Great Lakes tribal culture
Native American ethnobotany